Laila El Garaa (Arabic: ليلى الڭرعة) is a Paralympian athlete from Morocco competing mainly in category F40 shot put events.

Career
She competed in the 2004 Summer Paralympics in Athens, Greece. There she won a silver medal in the women's F40 shot put event.  She also took part in the women's F40 javelin throw

She also competed in the 2008 Summer Paralympics in Beijing, China. There she won a bronze medal in the women's F40 shot put event.  She also took part in the women's F40 discus throw.

Personal life
Her sisters Najat and Hayat are both Paralympic medalists.

References

External links
 

Paralympic athletes of Morocco
Athletes (track and field) at the 2004 Summer Paralympics
Athletes (track and field) at the 2008 Summer Paralympics
Athletes (track and field) at the 2012 Summer Paralympics
Paralympic silver medalists for Morocco
Paralympic bronze medalists for Morocco
Living people
Year of birth missing (living people)
Medalists at the 2004 Summer Paralympics
Medalists at the 2008 Summer Paralympics
Moroccan female discus throwers
Moroccan female shot putters
Competitors in athletics with dwarfism
Female competitors in athletics with disabilities
Paralympic medalists in athletics (track and field)
20th-century Moroccan women
21st-century Moroccan women